António Baticã Ferreira is a Manjaco poet. He was born in Canchungo in 1939. He attended high school in Paris, France and graduated with a degree in medicine from the University of Lausanne.

References

1939 births
Living people
Bissau-Guinean poets
Male poets
University of Lausanne alumni
20th-century poets
21st-century poets
People from Cacheu Region
20th-century male writers
21st-century male writers